Rasheedat Busayo Ajibade (born 8 December 1999) is a Nigerian professional footballer who plays as a forward for Spanish Liga F club Atlético Madrid and the Nigeria women's national team. She is nicknamed "RASH", a shortened form of her first name, and is also called "The Girl With The Blue Hair", an ode to her bright-blue hairstyle which she dons whenever she takes onto the field.

Ajibade represented Nigeria at age grade competitions, before making her competitive debut for the senior team at the 2018 WAFU Cup in Côte d'Ivoire. In 2017, she was named first in a top 10 list of most promising young footballers on the African continent by Goal.com.

Club career 
Ajibade played for FC Robo from the 2013 Nigeria Women Premier League season till 2018 season. In 2014, she was listed as one of the best young talents in the league. In September 2018, she won the Nigerian women football freestyle competition for the second consecutive time.

During the 2015 Nigeria Women Premier League week 2 games, Ajibade was listed in the team of the week, compiled by Soccerladuma South Africa, despite her team losing to Confluence Queens during the round of matches. For the 2017 Nigeria Women Premier League season, Ajibade was made team captain of FC Robo. Ajibade was one of the scorers in Robos' home win against Ibom Angels during the season. On 13 July 2017, after losing to visitors Rivers Angels, Ajibade was quoted by SuperSport to rue her team chances of qualifying for Super 4, because of the difference in points and the limited number of games remaining. Ajibade won the first edition of Nigeria National Freestyle Championship, which is a competition to promote freestyling football. In 2017, despite Robo not being among teams that finished tops, Ajibade was voted player of the season after scoring eight goals to save her team from relegation. In May 2018, she was nominated as the best player in the 2017 Nigeria Women Premier League at Nigeria Pitch Awards. In December 2018, Ajibade was reported to have signed a two-year contract with Norwegian side, Avaldsnes IL, a team that plays in the Toppserien.
On January 1, 2021, Atletico Madrid announced the signing of Rasheedat Ajibade on a two-year deal. 
In January 2022, Rasheedat Ajibade extended her contract with Atletico Madrid for a further three years, until 2025.

International career 
Rasheedat Ajibade has represented Nigeria at under-17, under-20 and senior national team. In the African qualifiers, en route to the 2014 FIFA U-17 Women's World Cup, Ajibade scored a brace for Nigeria first leg win over Namibia. At the competition proper, Ajibade scored the winning goal in Nigeria's first game against China. In the final group game against Mexico, Ajibade scored a goal in Nigeria, two goal win to seal a quarter final game with Spain.

Ajibade was named in Coach Bala Nikiyu 21-man squad for 2016 FIFA U-17 Women's World Cup, wearing jersey number 10. At the competition, Ajibade was the captain of Nigeria, and spoke to FIFA.com on the determination of the team to do better than the quarter-final finish they had in 2014. Ajibade was also part of Nigeria players at 2016 FIFA U-20 Women's World Cup, she was named man-of-the-match in the second group game against Canada.

In the first round encounter to determine Africa's representative at 2018 FIFA U-20 Women's World Cup, Ajibade scored a brace in the first leg tie against Tanzania, that gave Nigeria a three-goal advantage before the return leg in Dar e Sallam. In the return leg, played in October 2017, Ajibade scored two goals in Nigeria six goal win against the home-side. On 27 January 2018, Ajibade scored two goals in Nigeria's six goal win against South Africa, the win confirmed Nigeria's qualification for the 2018 FIFA U-20 Women's World Cup in France.

In February 2018, Ajibade alongside Joy Jegede, Osarenoma Igbinovia and 18 other players were selected by head coach, Thomas Dennerby to represent Nigeria at the inaugural edition of WAFU Cup in Côte d'Ivoire. In the second group game of the regional tournament, Ajibade scored a hat-trick to take Nigeria to the semi-finals with a game left.

Ajibade was part of the 2018 African Nations Championship Nigeria women's national football team where she won the tournament alongside the team. She captained the Super Falcons for the first time in a 1-0 friendly victory over Slovenian club, Olimpija Lubijana in Vienna, Austria.

Personal life 
In the summer of 2020, Rasheedat Ajibade launched the annual #StandOutWithRASH campaign, in partnership with leading Nigerian athlete branding company, EaglesTracker. It is a social media campaign aimed at promoting grassroots football talents within Nigeria. Rasheedat Ajibade uses her social media platform to provide visibility, encouragement, as well as football boots, jerseys and cash prizes to aspiring footballers who show how they stand out on the football field.

She also launched her official brand, RASH, which features a unique merchandise collection available for purchase to fans online. The brand is also involved in several other efforts within Nigeria.

Honours 
Atlético Madrid 
 Supercopa de Espana: 2020–21
Nigeria
 WAFU Women's Cup third place: 2018
 Women's Africa Cup of Nations: 2018 
Individual

 Toppserien Team of the Season: 2020

 League Bloggers Award NWPL Player of the Season: 2017
 Nigeria Pitch Awards NWPL Player of the season: 2017
 Nigeria Women Premier League Top scorer: 2017 (jointly held with Reuben Charity)
 Nigeria Football Federation Young Player Of The Year: 2018
 Women's Africa Cup of Nations Top scorer: 2022

References

External links

1999 births
Living people
Sportspeople from Lagos State
Nigerian women's footballers
Women's association football forwards
FC Robo players
Avaldsnes IL players
Atlético Madrid Femenino players
Toppserien players
Nigeria women's international footballers
2019 FIFA Women's World Cup players
Nigerian expatriate women's footballers
Nigerian expatriate sportspeople in Norway
Expatriate women's footballers in Norway
Nigerian expatriate sportspeople in Spain
Expatriate women's footballers in Spain
Yoruba sportswomen